Iris series Californicae are a series of the genus Iris, in Iris subg. Limniris. They are commonly known as Pacific Coast iris (PCI), or Pacific Coast natives (PCN).

It was further expanded by Lawrence in 'Gentes Herb' (written in Dutch) in 1953.

They all possess thin wiry, rhizomes and roots. They also have narrow, long evergreen leaves. Which are leathery and deep green.

The plants have unbranched flower stems that bear 2 or 3 flowers. The plants do clump quickly and produce many stems. They prefer acid soils. (all except 'Iris douglasiana', which prefers alkaline soils). In the wild, all the species are located on soils on slopes with good drainage. They grow at the edge of woods. They do not like root disturbance, so can be difficult to cultivate for the gardener. They can be grown in large clay pots in the UK, to be able to protect them in the winter. or they could be grown from seed, to stop root disturbance. Most flower between mid spring to early summer. April to June (in the UK). The leaves can turn red in the autumn. They have been used to create various hybrids. Mostly in America.

They come from the west coast of USA, native to California, Oregon, and Washington, they are mostly dwarf in size and flower in early summer. They vary in colour depending on the species.

It includes;
Iris bracteata S.Watson – Siskiyou iris
Iris chrysophylla Howell – yellow-leaved iris
Iris douglasiana Herb. – Douglas iris
Iris fernaldii R.C.Foster – Fernald's iris
Iris hartwegii Baker – Hartweg's iris, rainbow iris, Sierra iris
Iris innominata L.F.Hend. – Del Norte iris
Iris macrosiphon Torr. – bowltube iris
Iris munzii R.C.Foster – Munz's iris, Tulare lavender iris
Iris purdyi Eastw. – Purdy's iris
Iris tenax Douglas ex Lindl. – tough-leaved iris, Oregon iris
Iris tenuissima Dykes – (long-tubed iris)

References

Other sources
Evolutionary Studies in Iris Series Californicae, Carol Anne Wilson, University of California, Berkeley, 1996

External links

Official Society for Pacific Coast Native Iris website

Californicae
Flora of California
Natural history of the California chaparral and woodlands